Star Fleet Battles Expansion #1 is a 1980 expansion for Star Fleet Battles published by Task Force Games.

Gameplay
Star Fleet Battles Expansion #1 is an expansion kit with errata and rules clarifications based on the original Star Fleet Battles boxed set; also included are 30 new ship types with two new races and six near kinds of weapons, eight scenarios and two mini-campaign games.

Reception
Earl S. Cooley III reviewed Star Fleet Battles Expansion #1 in The Space Gamer No. 37. Cooley commented that "If you play SFB, I highly recommend this expansion kit, if only for the errata."

Steve List reviewed Star Fleet Battles: Expansion Module #1 in Ares Magazine #8 and commented that "What has been published so far goes well beyond Star Trek the TV show, but like Squad Leader and its offspring, it presents a basically playable system onto which layers of minute detail can be heaped ."

References

Star Fleet Battles
Wargames introduced in the 1980s